The Armstrong Siddeley Stentor, latterly Bristol Siddeley BSSt.1 Stentor, was a two-chamber HTP rocket engine used to power the Blue Steel stand-off missile carried by Britain's V bomber force. The high thrust chamber was used for the first 29 seconds, after which it was shut down and a smaller cruise chamber was used for the rest of the powered flight.

Design and development
It was fuelled by hydrogen peroxide with kerosene.

The engine incorporated an integral tubular mounting frame which was attached by six lugs to the rear bulkhead of the missile airframe, the complete engine being enclosed in a tube-shaped fairing with the nozzles at the rear.

Applications
Blue Steel missile

Engines on display
Preserved Stentor engines are on display at the following museums:
 Royal Air Force Museum Cosford
 Midland Air Museum
 The University of Liverpool, in the Department of Engineering foyer.
 South Yorkshire Aircraft Museum, Doncaster
 Newark Air Museum, Nottinghamshire
 Cambridge Science Centre, Cambridge

Specifications

{{rocketspecs

|ref=
|type=two chamber liquid-propellant rocket engine
|length= 
|weight=  including oil and nitrogen
|fueltype=kerosene
|oxidiser=hydrogen peroxide
|capacity=
|thrust=large boost chamber rated at  smaller cruise chamber rated at 
|thrust/weight=
|burn time=
|fuelcon=
|specfuelcon=
 Specific impulse: ~
}}

See also

References 

Rocket engines using hot cycle hydrogen peroxide propellant
Stentor
Rocket engines using kerosene propellant